Mark Harrington may refer to:

 Mark Harrington (HIV/AIDS activist) (born 1959 or 1960), American AIDS activist
 Mark Harrington (anti-abortion activist), American anti-abortion activist
 Mark Raymond Harrington (1882–1971), American archeologist
 Mark Harrington (painter) (born 1952), American-born Europe-based painter